Governor Merriam may refer to:

Frank Merriam (1865–1955), 28th Governor of California
William Rush Merriam (1849–1931), 11th Governor of Minnesota